In mathematics, in particular in algebraic topology and differential geometry, the Stiefel–Whitney classes are a set of topological invariants of a real vector bundle that describe the obstructions to constructing everywhere independent sets of sections of the vector bundle. Stiefel–Whitney classes are indexed from 0 to n, where n is the rank of the vector bundle. If the Stiefel–Whitney class of index i is nonzero, then there cannot exist  everywhere linearly independent sections of the vector bundle. A nonzero nth Stiefel–Whitney class indicates that every section of the bundle must vanish at some point.  A nonzero first Stiefel–Whitney class indicates that the vector bundle is not orientable.  For example, the first Stiefel–Whitney class of the Möbius strip, as a line bundle over the circle, is not zero, whereas the first Stiefel–Whitney class of the trivial line bundle over the circle, is zero.

The Stiefel–Whitney class was named for Eduard Stiefel and Hassler Whitney and is an example of a -characteristic class associated to real vector bundles.

In algebraic geometry one can also define analogous Stiefel–Whitney classes for vector bundles with a non-degenerate quadratic form, taking values in etale cohomology groups or in Milnor K-theory. As a special case one can define Stiefel–Whitney classes for quadratic forms over fields, the first two cases being the discriminant and the Hasse–Witt invariant .

Introduction

General presentation
It is an element of the cohomology ring

Thus, 

, 

(Here isomorphic means that there exists a vector bundle isomorphism  which covers the identity .)

As an example, over the circle , there is a line bundle (i.e., a real vector bundle of rank 1) that is not isomorphic to a trivial bundle. This line bundle  is the Möbius strip (which is a fiber bundle whose fibers can be equipped with vector space structures in such a way that it becomes a vector bundle). The cohomology group  has just one element other than 0.

It can also happen when  and  have the same rank: the tangent bundle of the 2-sphere  and the trivial real vector bundle of rank 2 over  have the same Stiefel–Whitney class, but they are not isomorphic. But if two real line bundles over  have the same Stiefel–Whitney class, then they are isomorphic.

Origins
The Stiefel–Whitney classes  get their name because Eduard Stiefel and Hassler Whitney discovered them as mod-2 reductions of the obstruction classes to constructing  everywhere linearly independent sections of the vector bundle  restricted to the i-skeleton of X. Here n denotes the dimension of the fibre of the vector bundle .

To be precise, provided X is a CW-complex, Whitney defined classes  in the i-th cellular cohomology group of X with twisted coefficients. The coefficient system being the -st homotopy group of the Stiefel manifold  of  linearly independent vectors in the fibres of E. Whitney proved that  if and only if E, when restricted to the i-skeleton of X, has  linearly-independent sections.

Moreover, whenever , the two classes are identical. Thus,  if and only if the bundle  is orientable.

The  class contains no information, because it is equal to 1 by definition. Its creation by Whitney was an act of creative notation, allowing the Whitney sum Formula  to be true.

Definitions
Throughout,  denotes singular cohomology of a space  with coefficients in the group . The word map means always a continuous function between topological spaces.

Axiomatic definition
The Stiefel-Whitney characteristic class  of a finite rank real vector bundle E on a paracompact base space X is defined as the unique class such that the following axioms are fulfilled:

 Normalization: The Whitney class of the tautological line bundle over the real projective space  is nontrivial, i.e., .
 Rank:  and for i above the rank of E, that is, 
 Whitney product formula: , that is, the Whitney class of a direct sum is the cup product of the summands' classes.
 Naturality:  for any real vector bundle  and map , where  denotes the pullback vector bundle.

The uniqueness of these classes is proved for example, in section 17.2 – 17.6 in Husemoller or section 8 in Milnor and Stasheff. There are several proofs of the existence, coming from various constructions, with several different flavours, their coherence is ensured by the unicity statement.

Definition via infinite Grassmannians

The infinite Grassmannians and vector bundles 
This section describes a construction using the notion of classifying space.

For any vector space V, let  denote the Grassmannian, the space of n-dimensional linear subspaces of V, and denote the infinite Grassmannian

.

Recall that it is equipped with the tautological bundle  a rank n vector bundle that can be defined as the subbundle of the trivial bundle of fiber V whose fiber at a point  is the subspace represented by Ẃ.

Let , be a continuous map to the infinite Grassmannian. Then, up to isomorphism, the bundle induced by the map f on X

depends only on the homotopy class of the map [f]. The pullback operation thus gives a morphism from the set

of maps  modulo homotopy equivalence, to the set

of isomorphism classes of vector bundles of rank n over X.

(The important fact in this construction is that if X is a paracompact space, this map is a bijection. This is the reason why we call infinite Grassmannians the classifying spaces of vector bundles.)

Now, by the naturality axiom (4) above, . Thus, for any rank-n bundle, where f is the appropriate classifying map. This in particular  provides one proof of the existence of the Stiefel–Whitney classes.

The case of line bundles
We now restrict the above construction to line bundles, ie we consider the space,  of line bundles over X. The Grassmannian of lines  is just the infinite projective space

which is doubly covered by the infinite sphere  by antipodal points. This sphere  is contractible, so we have

Hence P∞(R) is the Eilenberg-Maclane space .

It is a property of Eilenberg-Maclane spaces, that

for any X, with the isomorphism given by f → f*η, where η is the generator

.

Applying the former remark that α : [X, Gr1] → Vect1(X) is also a bijection, we obtain a bijection

this defines the Stiefel–Whitney class w1 for line bundles.

The group of line bundles 
If Vect1(X) is considered as a group under the operation of tensor product, then the Stiefel–Whitney class, w1 : Vect1(X) → H1(X; Z/2Z), is an isomorphism. That is, w1(λ ⊗ μ) = w1(λ) + w1(μ) for all line bundles λ, μ → X.

For example, since H1(S1; Z/2Z) = Z/2Z, there are only two line bundles over the circle up to bundle isomorphism: the trivial one, and the open Möbius strip (i.e., the Möbius strip with its boundary deleted).

The same construction for complex vector bundles shows that the Chern class defines a bijection between complex line bundles over X and H2(X; Z), because the corresponding classifying space is P∞(C), a K(Z, 2). This isomorphism is true for topological line bundles, the obstruction to injectivity of the Chern class for algebraic vector bundles is the Jacobian variety.

Properties

Topological interpretation of vanishing
 wi(E) = 0 whenever i > rank(E).
 If Ek has  sections which are everywhere linearly independent then the  top degree Whitney classes vanish: .
The first Stiefel–Whitney class is zero if and only if the bundle is orientable.  In particular, a manifold M is orientable if and only if w1(TM) = 0.
The bundle admits a spin structure if and only if both the first and second Stiefel–Whitney classes are zero.
For an orientable bundle, the second Stiefel–Whitney class is in the image of the natural map H2(M, Z) → H2(M, Z/2Z) (equivalently, the so-called third integral Stiefel–Whitney class is zero) if and only if the bundle admits a spinc structure.
All the Stiefel–Whitney numbers (see below)  of a smooth compact manifold X vanish if and only if  the manifold is the  boundary  of some smooth compact (unoriented) manifold   (Warning:  Some Stiefel-Whitney class could still  be non-zero, even if all the Stiefel Whitney numbers vanish!)

Uniqueness of the Stiefel–Whitney classes
The bijection above for line bundles implies that any functor θ satisfying the four axioms above is equal to w, by the following argument. The second axiom yields θ(γ1) = 1 + θ1(γ1). Thus the first and third axiom imply

Since the map

is an isomorphism,  and θ(γ1) = w(γ1) follow. Any line bundle over X is of the form  for some map g, and

by naturality. It follows from the fourth axiom above that

Since  is injective, θ = w. Thus the Stiefel–Whitney class is the unique functor satisfying the four axioms above.

Non-isomorphic bundles with the same Stiefel–Whitney classes
Although the map  is a bijection, the corresponding map is not necessarily injective in higher dimensions. For example, consider the tangent bundle  for n even. Since  is orientable,  is trivial. Hence w(TSn) = w(TSn)w(ν) = w(TSn ⊕ ν) = 1. But, provided n is even,  TSn → Sn is not trivial; its Euler class , where [Sn] denotes a fundamental class of Sn and χ the Euler characteristic.

Related invariants

Stiefel–Whitney numbers
If we work on a manifold of dimension n, then any product of Stiefel–Whitney classes of total degree n can be paired with the Z/2Z-fundamental class of the manifold to give an element of Z/2Z, a Stiefel–Whitney number of the vector bundle. In general, if the manifold has dimension n, the number of possible independent Stiefel–Whitney numbers is the number of partitions of n.

The Stiefel–Whitney numbers of the tangent bundle of a smooth manifold are called the Stiefel–Whitney numbers of the manifold.  They are known to be cobordism invariants. It was proven by Lev Pontryagin that if B is a smooth compact (n+1)–dimensional manifold with boundary equal to M, then the Stiefel-Whitney numbers of M are all zero. Moreover, it was proved by René Thom that if all the Stiefel-Whitney numbers of M are zero then M can be realised as the boundary of some smooth compact manifold.

One Stiefel–Whitney number of importance in surgery theory is the de Rham invariant of a (4k+1)-dimensional manifold,

Wu classes
Most simply, the total Stiefel–Whitney class is the total Steenrod square of the total Wu class: . Wu classes are most often defined implicitly in terms of Steenrod squares, as the cohomology class representing the Steenrod squares. Let the manifold X be n dimensional. Then, for any cohomology class x of degree ,

.  

Or more narrowly, we can demand , again for cohomology classes x of degree .

Integral Stiefel–Whitney classes
The element  is called the i + 1 integral Stiefel–Whitney class, where β is the Bockstein homomorphism, corresponding to reduction modulo 2, Z → Z/2Z:

For instance, the third integral Stiefel–Whitney class is the obstruction to a Spinc structure.

Relations over the Steenrod algebra
Over the Steenrod algebra, the Stiefel–Whitney classes of a smooth manifold (defined as the Stiefel–Whitney classes of the tangent bundle) are generated by those of the form .

See also
 Characteristic class for a general survey, in particular Chern class, the direct analogue for complex vector bundles
 Real projective space

References

 Dale Husemoller, Fibre Bundles, Springer-Verlag, 1994.

External links 
 Wu class at the Manifold Atlas

Characteristic classes